Kevin Rose is an American television and Internet personality.

Kevin Rose may also refer to:

 Kevin Rose (Australian rules footballer) (born 1939), Australian sportsman
 Kevin Rose (footballer, born 1960), English football goalkeeper